Drylands (1999) (subtitled "A Book for the World's Last Reader") is a Miles Franklin Award-winning novel by Australian author Thea Astley.  This novel shared the award with Benang by Kim Scott.

Awards

Miles Franklin Literary Award, 2000: joint winner 
Queensland Premier's Literary Awards, Best Fiction Book, 2000: winner

Review

 
 Kerryn Goldsworthy: "Drylands is Astley's Waste Land, with a cast of exhausted and alienated characters wandering through it in the death-grip of entropy, pursued by fin-de-siècle furies and other personifications of failure and defeat. In the small town of Drylands there are no fragments shored against anybody's ruin (well, there are, but even the fragments get vandalized and tossed), and there is certainly none of the peace that passeth understanding."

Notes

For a description of "drylands" see biomes.

References

Middlemiss.org

1999 Australian novels
Miles Franklin Award-winning works
Novels by Thea Astley
Penguin Press books